Dracula is a color scheme for a large collection of desktop apps and website, with a focus on code editors and terminal emulators, created by Zeno Rocha. The scheme is exclusively available in dark mode. Packages that implement the color scheme have been published for many major applications, such as Visual Studio Code (2.9M installs), Sublime Text (160K installs), Atom (250K installs), JetBrains IDEs (820K installs), and 218 other applications.

History
Zeno Rocha began working on Dracula in 2013 after having his computer stolen at a hospital in Madrid, Spain. Upon installing a new code editor and terminal emulator, he could not find a color scheme that he liked, so he decided to create his own. He always believed in the cost of context switching, therefore his goal was to create a uniform and consistent experience across all his applications. On October 27, 2013, he published the first Dracula theme for ZSH on GitHub.

On February 11, 2020, Rocha launched a premium version called Dracula PRO. On February 25, 2021, Dracula PRO reported $100k in sales. As of March 2023, Dracula PRO has reported over $250k in sales.

Color palette

Reception
Over the years, Dracula became popular among software developers. Joey Sneddon of omg!ubuntu! recommended Dracula, noting its wide compatibility, as well as its open source nature. Writing for SpeckyBoy Magazine, Eric Karkovack reported that "Dracula is a dark theme that presents some great color contrast. Using a dark background actually saves energy as well...". Nick Congleton of LinuxConfig.org described it as one of the best Linux terminal color schemes. Twilio featured Dracula as one their favorite Halloween hacks. Adobe listed Dracula as one of their featured Design System Packages. Sudo Null IT News said that "Dracula Theme is a universal theme for almost everything". Eric L. Barnes from Laravel News told that "Dracula theme is a great way to get your development environment ready". Lizzy Lawrence from The Protocol reported that "Dracula is the dark mode color scheme with a cult following of coders".

Gallery

References

External links
 

Color schemes
Software using the MIT license
2013 software